In four-dimensional geometry, the rectified 5-cell is a uniform 4-polytope composed of 5 regular tetrahedral and 5 regular octahedral cells. Each edge has one tetrahedron and two octahedra. Each vertex has two tetrahedra and three octahedra. In total it has 30 triangle faces, 30 edges, and 10 vertices. Each vertex is surrounded by 3 octahedra and 2 tetrahedra; the vertex figure is a triangular prism.

Topologically, under its highest symmetry, [3,3,3], there is only one geometrical form, containing 5 regular tetrahedra and 5 rectified tetrahedra (which is geometrically the same as a regular octahedron). It is also topologically identical to a tetrahedron-octahedron segmentochoron.

The vertex figure of the rectified 5-cell is a uniform triangular prism, formed by three octahedra around the sides, and two tetrahedra on the opposite ends.

Despite having the same number of vertices as cells (10) and the same number of edges as faces (30), the rectified 5-cell is not self-dual because the vertex figure (a uniform triangular prism) is not a dual of the polychoron's cells.

Wythoff construction 
Seen in a configuration matrix, all incidence counts between elements are shown. The diagonal f-vector numbers are derived through the Wythoff construction, dividing the full group order of a subgroup order by removing one mirror at a time.

Structure
Together with the simplex and 24-cell, this shape and its dual (a polytope with ten vertices and ten triangular bipyramid facets) was one of the first 2-simple 2-simplicial 4-polytopes known. This means that all of its two-dimensional faces, and all of the two-dimensional faces of its dual, are triangles. In 1997, Tom Braden found another dual pair of examples, by gluing two rectified 5-cells together; since then, infinitely many 2-simple 2-simplicial polytopes have been constructed.

Semiregular polytope
It is one of three semiregular 4-polytopes made of two or more cells which are Platonic solids, discovered by Thorold Gosset in his 1900 paper. He called it a tetroctahedric for being made of tetrahedron and octahedron cells.

E. L. Elte identified it in 1912 as a semiregular polytope, labeling it as tC5.

Alternate names 
 Tetroctahedric (Thorold Gosset)
 Dispentachoron
 Rectified 5-cell (Norman W. Johnson)
 Rectified 4-simplex
 Fully truncated 4-simplex
 Rectified pentachoron (Acronym: rap) (Jonathan Bowers)
 Ambopentachoron (Neil Sloane & John Horton Conway)
 (5,2)-hypersimplex (the convex hull of five-dimensional (0,1)-vectors with exactly two ones)

Images

Coordinates 
The Cartesian coordinates of the vertices of an origin-centered rectified 5-cell having edge length 2 are:

More simply, the vertices of the rectified 5-cell can be positioned on a hyperplane in 5-space as permutations of (0,0,0,1,1) or (0,0,1,1,1).  These construction can be seen as positive orthant facets of the rectified pentacross or birectified penteract respectively.

Related 4-polytopes 
The rectified 5-cell is the vertex figure of the 5-demicube, and the edge figure of the uniform 221 polytope.

Compound of the rectified 5-cell and its dual 
The convex hull the rectified 5-cell and its dual (of the same long radius) is a nonuniform polychoron composed of 30 cells: 10 tetrahedra, 20 octahedra (as triangular antiprisms), and 20 vertices. Its vertex figure is a triangular bifrustum.

Pentachoron polytopes 
The rectified 5-cell is one of 9 Uniform 4-polytopes constructed from the [3,3,3] Coxeter group.

Semiregular polytopes 
The rectified 5-cell is second in a dimensional series of semiregular polytopes. Each progressive uniform polytope is constructed as the vertex figure of the previous polytope. Thorold Gosset identified this series in 1900 as containing all regular polytope facets, containing all simplexes and orthoplexes (tetrahedrons and octahedrons in the case of the rectified 5-cell). The Coxeter symbol for the rectified 5-cell is 021.

Isotopic polytopes

Notes

References 
 T. Gosset: On the Regular and Semi-Regular Figures in Space of n Dimensions, Messenger of Mathematics, Macmillan, 1900
 J.H. Conway and M.J.T. Guy: Four-Dimensional Archimedean Polytopes, Proceedings of the Colloquium on Convexity at Copenhagen, page 38 and 39, 1965 
 H.S.M. Coxeter: 
 H.S.M. Coxeter, Regular Polytopes, 3rd Edition, Dover New York, 1973 
 Kaleidoscopes: Selected Writings of H.S.M. Coxeter, edited by F. Arthur Sherk, Peter McMullen, Anthony C. Thompson, Asia Ivic Weiss, Wiley-Interscience Publication, 1995,  
 (Paper 22) H.S.M. Coxeter, Regular and Semi Regular Polytopes I, [Math. Zeit. 46 (1940) 380-407, MR 2,10]
 (Paper 23) H.S.M. Coxeter, Regular and Semi-Regular Polytopes II, [Math. Zeit. 188 (1985) 559-591]
 (Paper 24) H.S.M. Coxeter, Regular and Semi-Regular Polytopes III, [Math. Zeit. 200 (1988) 3-45]
 Norman Johnson Uniform Polytopes, Manuscript (1991)
 N.W. Johnson: The Theory of Uniform Polytopes and Honeycombs, Ph.D. (1966)
 John H. Conway, Heidi Burgiel, Chaim Goodman-Strauss, The Symmetries of Things 2008,  (Chapter 26)

External links
 Rectified 5-cell - data and images
 
 

4-polytopes